This list of mammals of Nepal presents mammal species recorded in Nepal, of which one is critically endangered, eleven are endangered, twenty are vulnerable, and four are near threatened.
The following tags are used to highlight each species' conservation status as assessed on the IUCN Red List:

Order: Artiodactyla (even-toed ungulates) 

The even-toed ungulates are ungulates whose weight is borne about equally by the third and fourth toes, rather than mostly or entirely by the third as in perissodactyls. There are about 220 artiodactyl species, including many that are of great economic importance to humans.
Family: Bovidae (cattle, antelope, sheep, goats)
Genus: Antilope
Blackbuck, A. cervicapra 
Genus: Bos
Gaur, B. gaurus 
Wild yak, B. mutus 
Genus Boselaphus 
Nilgai, B. tragocamelus 
Genus: Bubalus
Wild water buffalo, B. arnee 
Genus: Capricornis
Mainland serow, C. sumatraensis 
 Himalayan serow, C. s. thar
Genus: Hemitragus
 Himalayan tahr, H. jemlahicus 
Genus: Naemorhedus 
Himalayan goral N. goral 
 Genus: Ovis
Argali, O. ammon 
Genus: Pseudois
Bharal, P. nayaur 
Genus: Tetracerus
Four-horned antelope, T. quadricornis 
Family: Cervidae (deer)
Genus: Axis
Chital, A. axis 
Indian hog deer, A. porcinus 
Genus: Muntiacus
Indian muntjac, M. muntjak 
Genus: Rucervus
Barasingha, R. duvaucelii 
Genus: Rusa
 Sambar deer, R. unicolor 
Family: Moschidae
Genus: Moschus
Alpine musk deer, M. chrysogaster 
 Black musk deer, M. fuscus 
White-bellied musk deer, M. leucogaster 
Family: Suidae (pigs)
Genus: Sus
Wild boar, S. scrofa 
Family: Tragulidae
Genus: Moschiola
 Indian spotted chevrotain, M. indica

Order: Carnivora (carnivorans) 

There are over 260 species of carnivorans; the majority primarily eat meat. They have a characteristic skull shape and dentition.
Suborder: Feliformia
Family: Felidae (cats)
Subfamily: Felinae
Genus: Catopuma
Asian golden cat, C. temminckii 
Genus: Felis
Jungle cat, F. chaus 
Genus: Lynx
Eurasian lynx, L. lynx 
Genus: Otocolobus
Pallas's cat, O. manul 
Genus: Prionailurus
Leopard cat, P. bengalensis 
Rusty-spotted cat, P. rubiginosus 
Fishing cat, P. viverrinus 
Subfamily: Pantherinae
Genus: Neofelis
Clouded leopard, N. nebulosa 
Genus: Panthera
Leopard, P. pardus 
Indian leopard, P. p. fusca
Tiger, P. tigris 
Bengal tiger, P. t. tigris
Snow leopard, P. uncia 
Family: Viverridae
Subfamily: Paradoxurinae
Genus: Arctictis
Binturong, A. binturong 
Genus: Paradoxurus
Asian palm civet, P. hermaphroditus 
Genus: Paguma
Masked palm civet, P. larvata 
Subfamily: Viverrinae
Genus: Viverra
Large Indian civet, V. zibetha 
Genus: Viverricula
Small Indian civet, V. indica 
Subfamily: Prionodontinae
Genus: Prionodon
Spotted linsang, P. pardicolor 
Family: Herpestidae (mongooses)
Genus: Urva
Small Indian mongoose, U. auropunctatus 
Indian grey mongoose, U. edwardsii 
Ruddy mongoose, U. smithii 
Crab-eating mongoose, U. urva 
Family: Hyaenidae (hyaenas)
Genus: Hyaena
Striped hyena, H. hyaena 
Suborder: Caniformia
Family: Ailuridae (lesser panda)
Genus: Ailurus
Red panda, A. fulgens 
Family: Canidae (dogs, foxes)
Genus: Canis
Golden jackal, C. aureus 
Gray wolf, C. lupus 
 Himalayan wolf, C. l. chanco
Genus: Cuon
Dhole, C. alpinus 
Genus: Vulpes
Bengal fox, V. bengalensis 
Tibetan fox, V. ferrilata 
Red fox, V. vulpes 
Family: Ursidae (bears)
Genus: Melursus
Sloth bear, M. ursinus 
Genus: Ursus
Brown bear, U. arctos 
Himalayan brown bear, U. a. isabellinus
Asiatic black bear, U. thibetanus 
Himalayan black bear, U. t. laniger 
Family: Mustelidae (mustelids)
Genus: Aonyx
Asian small-clawed otter, A. cinereus 
Genus: Lutrogale
Smooth-coated otter, L. perspicillata 
Genus: Martes
Yellow-throated marten, M. flavigula 
Genus: Mellivora
Honey badger, M. capensis 
Genus: Mustela
Mountain weasel, M. altaica 
Yellow-bellied weasel, M. kathiah 
Siberian weasel, M. sibirica

Order: Cetacea (whales) 

The order Cetacea includes whales, dolphins and porpoises. They are the mammals most fully adapted to aquatic life with a spindle-shaped nearly hairless body, protected by a thick layer of blubber, and forelimbs and tail modified to provide propulsion underwater.
Suborder: Odontoceti
Superfamily: Platanistoidea
Family: Platanistidae
Genus: Platanista
Ganges river dolphin, P. gangetica

Order: Chiroptera (bats) 

The bats' most distinguishing feature is that their forelimbs are developed as wings, making them the only mammals capable of flight. Bat species account for about 20% of all mammals.
Family: Pteropodidae (flying foxes, Old World fruit bats)
Subfamily: Pteropodinae
Genus: Cynopterus
Lesser short-nosed fruit bat, C. brachyotis 
Greater short-nosed fruit bat, C. sphinx 
Genus: Macroglossus
Long-tongued fruit bat, M. sobrinus 
Genus: Pteropus
Indian flying fox, P. giganteus 
Genus: Rousettus
Leschenault's rousette, R. leschenaulti 
Genus: Sphaerias
Blanford's fruit bat, S. blanfordi 
Family: Hipposideridae (leaf nosed bats)
Genus: Coelops
East Asian tailless leaf-nosed bat, Coelops frithii 
Genus: Hipposideros
Ashy roundleaf bat, H. cineraceus 
Fulvus roundleaf bat, Hipposideros fulvus 
Indian roundleaf bat, Hipposideros lankadiva 
Intermediate roundleaf bat, Hipposideros larvatus 
Pomona roundleaf bat, Hipposideros pomona 
Family: Megadermatidae
Genus: Megaderma (false vampire bats)
Greater false vampire bat, Megaderma lyra 
Family: Vespertilionidae
Subfamily: Kerivoulinae
Genus: Kerivoula
Painted bat, Kerivoula picta 
Subfamily: Myotinae
Genus: Myotis
Csorba's mouse-eared bat, Myotis csorbai 
Daubenton's bat, M. daubentonii 
Hodgson's bat, M. formosus 
Kashmir cave bat, Myotis longipes 
Whiskered myotis, Myotis muricola 
Mandelli's mouse-eared bat, Myotis sicarius 
Himalayan whiskered bat, Myotis siligorensis 
Subfamily: Vespertilioninae
Genus: Arielulus
Black-gilded pipistrelle, A- circumdatus 
Genus: Barbastella
Eastern barbastelle, Barbastella leucomelas 
Genus: Eptesicus
Sombre bat, Eptesicus tatei 
Genus: Falsistrellus
Chocolate pipistrelle, Falsistrellus affinis 
Genus: Hesperoptenus
Tickell's bat, Hesperoptenus tickelli 
Genus: Ia
Great evening bat, I. io 
Genus: Nyctalus
Mountain noctule, Nyctalus montanus 
Genus: Philetor
Rohu's bat, Philetor brachypterus 
Genus: Pipistrellus
Indian pipistrelle, Pipistrellus coromandra 
Java pipistrelle, Pipistrellus javanicus 
Chocolate pipistrelle, Falsistrellus affinis 
Genus: Scotomanes
Harlequin bat, Scotomanes ornatus 
Lesser Asiatic yellow bat, Scotophilus kuhlii 
Greater Asiatic yellow bat, Scotophilus heathii 
Subfamily: Murininae
Genus: Murina
Hutton's tube-nosed bat, Murina huttoni 
Greater tube-nosed bat, Murina leucogaster 
Subfamily: Miniopterinae
Genus: Miniopterus
Small bent-winged bat, Miniopterus pusillus 
Common bent-wing bat, M. schreibersii 
Family: Molossidae
Genus: Chaerephon
 Wrinkle-lipped free-tailed bat, Chaerephon plicata 
Family: Rhinolophidae
Subfamily: Rhinolophinae
Genus: Rhinolophus
 Intermediate horseshoe bat, Rhinolophus affinis 
Greater horseshoe bat, R. ferrumequinum 
Blyth's horseshoe bat, R. lepidus "
Woolly horseshoe bat, R. luctus 
Big-eared horseshoe bat, R. macrotis 
Pearson's horseshoe bat, Rhinolophus pearsoni 
Least horseshoe bat, Rhinolophus pusillus 
Rufous horseshoe bat, Rhinolophus rouxi 
Chinese rufous horseshoe bat, Rhinolophus sinicus 
Little Nepalese horseshoe bat, Rhinolophus subbadius 
Trefoil horseshoe bat, Rhinolophus trifoliatus 
Subfamily: Hipposiderinae
Genus: Hipposideros
Great roundleaf bat, Hipposideros armiger 
Pomona roundleaf bat, Hipposideros pomona

Order: Lagomorpha (lagomorphs) 

The lagomorphs comprise two families, Leporidae (hares and rabbits), and Ochotonidae (pikas). Though they can resemble rodents, and were classified as a superfamily in that order until the early 20th century, they have since been considered a separate order. They differ from rodents in a number of physical characteristics, such as having four incisors in the upper jaw rather than two.
Family: Ochotonidae (pikas)
Genus: Ochotona
 Black-lipped pika, O. curzoniae 
 Himalayan pika, O. himalayana 
 Large-eared pika, O. macrotis 
 Nubra pika, O. nubrica 
 Royle's pika, O. roylei 
Family: Leporidae (rabbits, hares)
Genus: Caprolagus
Hispid hare, C. hispidus 
Genus: Lepus
Indian hare, L. nigricollis 
Woolly hare, L. oiostolus

Order: Perissodactyla (odd-toed ungulates) 

The odd-toed ungulates are browsing and grazing mammals. They are usually large to very large, and have relatively simple stomachs and a large middle toe.
Family: Equidae
Genus: Equus
 Kiang, E. kiang 
Family: Rhinocerotidae
Genus: Rhinoceros
 Indian rhinoceros, R. unicornis

Order: Primates 

The order Primates contains humans and their closest relatives: lemurs, lorisoids, monkeys, and apes.
Suborder: Haplorhini
Infraorder: Simiiformes
Parvorder: Catarrhini
Superfamily: Cercopithecoidea
Family: Cercopithecidae (Old World monkeys)
Genus: Macaca
Assam macaque, M. assamensis 
 Rhesus macaque, M. mulatta 
Subfamily: Colobinae
Genus: Semnopithecus
 Tarai gray langur, S. hector 
 Nepal gray langur, S. schistaceus

Order: Proboscidea (elephants) 

The elephants comprise three living species and are the largest living land animals.

Family: Elephantidae (elephants)
Genus: Elephas
 Asian elephant, E. maximus

Order: Rodentia (rodents) 

Rodents make up the largest order of mammals, with over 40% of mammalian species. They have two incisors in the upper and lower jaw which grow continually and must be kept short by gnawing.
Suborder: Hystricognathi
Family: Hystricidae (Old World porcupines)
Genus: Hystrix
Malayan porcupine, H. brachyura 
Indian crested porcupine, H. indica 
Suborder: Sciurognathi
Family: Sciuridae (squirrels)
Subfamily: Ratufinae
Genus: Ratufa
 Black giant squirrel, Ratufa bicolor NT
Subfamily: Sciurinae
Tribe: Pteromyini
Genus: Belomys
 Hairy-footed flying squirrel, Belomys pearsonii DD
Genus: Hylopetes
 Particolored flying squirrel, Hylopetes alboniger EN
Genus: Petaurista
 Spotted giant flying squirrel, Petaurista elegans LC
 Hodgson's giant flying squirrel, Petaurista magnificus LC
 Bhutan giant flying squirrel, Petaurista nobilis NT
 Red giant flying squirrel, Petaurista petaurista LC
Subfamily: Callosciurinae
Genus: Callosciurus
Irrawaddy squirrel, C. pygerythrus 
Genus: Dremomys
 Orange-bellied Himalayan squirrel, Dremomys lokriah LC
Genus: Funambulus
 Northern palm squirrel, Funambulus pennantii LC
Genus: Tamiops
 Himalayan striped squirrel, Tamiops macclellandi LC
Subfamily: Xerinae
Genus: Marmota
Himalayan marmot, M. himalayana 
Family: Spalacidae
Subfamily: Rhizomyinae
Genus: Cannomys
 Lesser bamboo rat, Cannomys badius LC
Family: Cricetidae
Subfamily: Cricetinae
Genus: Cricetulus
 Tibetan dwarf hamster, Cricetulus alticola LC
Subfamily: Arvicolinae
Genus: Alticola
 Stoliczka's mountain vole, Alticola stoliczkanus LC
 Strachey's mountain vole, Alticola stracheyi LC
Genus: Microtus
 Sikkim vole, Microtus sikimensis LC
Family: Muridae (mice, rats, voles, gerbils, hamsters, etc.)
Subfamily: Gerbillinae
Genus: Tatera
 Indian gerbil, Tatera indica LC
Subfamily: Murinae
Genus: Apodemus
 Himalayan field mouse, Apodemus gurkha LC
 Kashmir field mouse, Apodemus rusiges LC
 Ward's field mouse, Apodemus wardi LC
Genus: Bandicota
 Greater bandicoot rat, Bandicota indica LC
Genus: Dacnomys
 Millard's rat, Dacnomys millardi LC
Genus: Diomys
 Crump's mouse, Diomys crumpi DD
Genus: Millardia
 Soft-furred rat, Millardia meltada LC
Genus: Mus
 Little Indian field mouse, Mus booduga LC
 Fawn-colored mouse, Mus cervicolor LC
 Cook's mouse, Mus cookii LC
 Rock-loving mouse, Mus saxicola LC
 Earth-colored mouse, Mus terricolor LC
Genus: Niviventer
 Smoke-bellied rat, Niviventer eha LC
 Chestnut white-bellied rat, Niviventer fulvescens LC
 White-bellied rat, Niviventer niviventer LC
Genus: Rattus
 Himalayan field rat, Rattus nitidus LC
 Sikkim rat, Rattus sikkimensis VU
 Tanezumi rat, Rattus tanezumi LC
Turkestan rat, R. pyctorius 
Genus: Vandeleuria
 Asiatic long-tailed climbing mouse, Vandeleuria oleracea LC

Order: Soricomorpha (shrews, moles, and solenodons) 

The "shrew-forms" are insectivorous mammals. The shrews and solenodons closely resemble mice while the moles are stout-bodied burrowers.
Family: Soricidae (shrews)
Subfamily: Crocidurinae
Genus: Crocidura
 Grey shrew, C. attenuata 
 Horsefield's shrew, C. horsfieldii 
Genus: Suncus
 Etruscan shrew, S. etruscus LC
Asian house shrew, S. murinus 
 Anderson's shrew, Suncus stoliczkanus LC
Genus: Soriculus
 Long-tailed brown-toothed shrew, Soriculus leucops LC
 Long-tailed mountain shrew, Soriculus macrurus LC
 Himalayan shrew, Soriculus nigrescens LC
Tribe: Soricini
Genus: Sorex
 Eurasian pygmy shrew, Sorex minutus LC
Family: Talpidae (moles)
Subfamily: Talpinae
Tribe: Talpini
Genus: Euroscaptor
 Himalayan mole, Euroscaptor micrura LC

Order: Pholidota (pangolins) 

The order Pholidota comprises the eight species of pangolin. Pangolins are anteaters and have the powerful claws, elongated snout and long tongue seen in the other unrelated anteater species.
Family: Manidae
Genus: Manis
Indian pangolin, M. crassicaudata 
Chinese pangolin, M. pentadactyla

Locally extinct
The following species are locally extinct in the country:
 Tibetan antelope, Pantholops hodgsonii
 Pygmy hog, Porcula salvanius

See also
List of chordate orders
Lists of mammals by region
List of prehistoric mammals
Mammal classification
List of mammals described in the 2000s

References

External links

.
Mammals
Nepal
Nepal
Mammals of South Asia